The Flood Building is a 12-story highrise located at 870 Market Street on the corner of Powell Street in the downtown shopping district of San Francisco, California completed in 1904 and designed by Albert Pissis. Situated on Powell and Market streets, next to the Powell Street cable car turntable, Hallidie Plaza and the Powell Street BART Station entrance, it is one of the few structures that survived the 1906 San Francisco earthquake.

The site formerly housed Baldwin's Hotel and Theatre, which was destroyed by fire in 1898. It was later purchased by James L. Flood, who constructed the building as a tribute to his father, James Clair Flood (1826–1889, the Comstock Lode millionaire). In 2003, it was still owned by the Flood family.

John King, the architecture critic of the San Francisco Chronicle, praised the Flood Building as "twelve stories of orderly pomp with a rounded prow that commands the corner of Powell and Market Streets ... Every detail is rooted and right, from the tall storefronts that beckon cable car daytrippers to the baroque cliff of the sandstone façade with its deep-chiseled windows and just enough ornamentation to enliven the mass rather than clutter the scene."

Major tenants
The Southern Pacific Railroad company maintained its headquarters in the building after its earthquake renovations from 1907 until 1917 when it moved to its own building now at One Market Plaza. The F. W. Woolworth Company store located on basement level and first and second floors was the largest in the chain until 1992, when it was downsized, and later closed in 1996. More recent major tenants include the flagship stores for retailers Gap, Urban Outfitters, and Anthropologie.

The Pinkerton Detective Agency had an office in Room 314 of the building, and employed Dashiell Hammett, an author of hard-boiled detective novels, as an operative.

See also
List of San Francisco Designated Landmarks

References

External links

 Official Flood Building website

1900s architecture in the United States
Beaux-Arts architecture in California
Kaplan McLaughlin Diaz buildings
Market Street (San Francisco)
Skyscraper office buildings in San Francisco
Office buildings completed in 1904
San Francisco Designated Landmarks
Union Square, San Francisco